The 87th edition of the KNVB Cup (at the time called Amstel Cup) started on 7 August 2004. The final was played on 29 May 2005. PSV beat Willem II 4–0, winning the trophy for the eighth time.

Participants
A total of 85 clubs participated in this year's edition:
 18 clubs from the 2004–05 Eredivisie
 19 clubs from the Eerste Divisie 2004–05
 46 amateurs clubs from the Hoofdklasse and below
 2 youth teams

First round
The matches of the first round were played on August 7 and 10, 2004.

E Eredivisie; 1 Eerste Divisie; A Amateur teams

Second round
The matches of the second round were played on September 21, and 22, 2005. NEC Nijmegen received a bye for the first round and entered the tournament here.

E one Eredivisie entrant

Third round
The matches of the third round were played on November 9, and 10, 2004.

Round of 16
The matches were played on January 25, 26 and 27, 2005. Six Eredivisie clubs entered the tournament here, because they had been playing in the Champions League and UEFA Cup.

E six Eredivisie entrants

Quarter-finals
The matches were played on 1-2 March 2005.

Semi-finals

Final

PSV also won the Dutch Eredivisie championship, thereby taking the double. They would participate in the Champions League, so finalists Willem II could play in the UEFA Cup.

See also
 2004–05 Eredivisie
 Eerste Divisie 2004–05

External links
 Results by Ronald Zwiers  

2004-05
2004–05 domestic association football cups
2004–05 in Dutch football